Old Ben is a 1970 book by Jesse Stuart, illustrated by Richard Cuffari. It was selected for the 1970 Lewis Carroll Shelf Award.

Summary 
The story of Shan, a Kentucky boy, and the friendship he forms with a big Cottonmouth snake.

References 

1970 books
Fictional snakes